Wiretail may refer to:

Des Murs's wiretail, a bird of southern South America
Rhadinosticta, also called the powdered wiretail, a genus of damselfly